David A. Fidock (born 8 December 1965), is the CS Hamish Young Professor of Microbiology and Immunology and Professor of Medical Sciences at Columbia University Irving Medical Center in Manhattan.

Education
Fidock was born in Paris, on 8 December 1965 and moved to Australia when he was seven years old. He attended the University of Adelaide and earned a bachelor of mathematical sciences and an honors degree in genetics in 1985. He earned a PhD in microbiology and a diploma in medical entomology from the Institut Pasteur in Paris in 1994.

Research 
Fidock's research focuses on the genetic and molecular mechanisms behind antimalarial drug resistance in the human parasite Plasmodium falciparum, as well as target-based drug discovery and development, genetically attenuated vaccinations, and parasite metabolism. He pioneered the development of methods for genetically modifying malaria parasites and for elucidating the genetic basis of P. falciparum resistance to various first-line medicines (including artemisinin, chloroquine and piperaquine).

Awards
Project of the Year 2020 from Medicines for Malaria Venture for critical contribution to malaria drug resistance profiling

Publications 
 The Plasmodium falciparum ABC transporter ABCI3 confers parasite strain-dependent pleiotropic antimalarial drug resistance. Cell Chem Biol (in press).
Plasmodium falciparum K13 mutations in Africa and Asia impact artemisinin resistance and parasite fitness. Elife 10: e66277.
Inhibition of resistance-refractory P. falciparum kinase PKG delivers prophylactic, blood stage, and transmission-blocking antiplasmodial activity. Cell Chem Biol 27: 806-16.
Insights into the intracellular localization, protein associations and artemisinin resistance properties of Plasmodium falciparum K13. PLoS Pathog 16: e1008482.
Covalent Plasmodium falciparum-selective proteasome inhibitors exhibit a low propensity for generating resistance in vitro and synergize with multiple antimalarial agents. PLoS Pathog 15: e1007722.
Plasmodium falciparum resistance to piperaquine driven by PfCRT. Lancet Infect Dis 19: 1168-9.
Structure and drug resistance of the Plasmodium falciparum transporter PfCRT. Nature 576: 315-20.

References

External links
David Fidock

Australian microbiologists
Living people
University of Adelaide alumni
French emigrants to Australia
Scientists from Paris
1965 births